Natasha "Tasha" Yar is a fictional character that mainly appeared in the first season of the American science fiction television series Star Trek: The Next Generation. Portrayed by Denise Crosby, Yar is chief of security aboard the Starfleet starship USS Enterprise-D and carries the rank of lieutenant. The character's concept was based upon the character of Vasquez from the film Aliens (1986). Following further development, she became known first as Tanya, and then Tasha. Crosby had auditioned for the role of Deanna Troi, while Rosalind Chao became a favorite for Tasha. After Marina Sirtis auditioned for the role, the series' creator Gene Roddenberry decided to switch the roles for the actresses, with Sirtis becoming Troi and Crosby becoming Yar. Chao would later appear on the series in a recurring role as Keiko O'Brien.

The character first appeared in the series' pilot episode, "Encounter at Farpoint". After Crosby decided to leave the series, Yar was killed in the episode "Skin of Evil" near the end of the series' first season. She was written back into the series for a guest appearance in the third season episode "Yesterday's Enterprise", in which her character was still alive in an alternate timeline, and again in the final episode of the series "All Good Things...", which included events set prior to the pilot.

Yar was described as a forerunner to other strong women in science fiction, such as Kara Thrace from the 2004 version of Battlestar Galactica, while providing a step between the appearances of female characters on The Original Series to the command positions they have on Star Trek: Deep Space Nine and Voyager. Questions were raised over the sexuality of the character, and it was thought that the events in the episode "The Naked Now" were designed to establish her heterosexuality. 

The manner of Yar's first death was received with mostly negative reviews. One critic called it typical of the death of a Star Trek security officer, and the scene was also included in a list of tasteless sci-fi deaths.

Concept and development
Inspired by Vasquez in Aliens, the character was initially named "Macha Hernandez" and was the tactical officer of the Enterprise. This had been changed by the first casting call—issued on December 10, 1986—when she was given the position of security chief. The producers considered Jenette Goldstein, who had played Vasquez, for the role, but writer Dorothy Fontana pointed out that the actress "is not Latina. She is petite, blue-eyed, freckle-faced". The character was subsequently renamed "Tanya" around March 13.

By the time that the writers' and directors' guide for the series was published, dated March 23, 1987, the character was named Natasha "Tasha" Yar. Her surname was suggested by Robert Lewin, drawing inspiration from the Babi Yar atrocities in Ukraine during the Second World War. Her biography stated that she was 28 years old, and confirmed her Ukrainian descent. She was planned to have a friendship with teenager Wesley Crusher, and was described in the guide as "treat[ing] this boy like the most wonderful person imaginable. Wes is the childhood friend that Tasha never had."

In April 1987, Lianne Langland, Julia Nickson, Rosalind Chao, Leah Ayres, and Bunty Bailey were each listed as being in contention for the role. Chao was a favorite candidate, while Denise Crosby was described as "the only possibility" for the character of Deanna Troi. The production staff were not keen on having two actresses in the bridge crew roles with similar physical types and hair colors, and so the team took account of the casting of the two roles together. The writers and directors guide described Yar as having a muscular but very feminine body type, and being sufficiently athletic to defeat most other crew members in martial arts. After Crosby and Marina Sirtis had each auditioned for Troi and Yar respectively, Gene Roddenberry decided to switch the actresses and cast Crosby as Tasha Yar. He felt that Sirtis' appearance was better suited to the "exotic" Troi.

Resolution
Before the end of the first season, Crosby asked to be released from her contract as she was unhappy that her character was not being developed. She later said "I was miserable. I couldn't wait to get off that show. I was dying". Roddenberry agreed to her request and she left on good terms. The final episode she filmed was "Symbiosis", which was completed after Yar's death in "Skin of Evil". Her last scene was during the final act of the episode, in which a holographic farewell recording of her is played for the bridge crew. After her departure, archive footage of Crosby as Yar was used in the episodes "The Schizoid Man" and "Shades of Gray".

Crosby was happy to return in "Yesterday's Enterprise" due to the strength of the script, saying that "I had more to do in that episode than I'd ever had to do before". Prior to the episode being aired, the media had to be reassured that Yar was not returning in a dream sequence. Following her appearance in that episode, Crosby pitched the idea of Yar's daughter, Sela, to the producers. She made her first appearance in this role in the two-part "Redemption" and appeared once more in another two-part episode, "Unification". Denise returned twice more in the non-canon Star Trek universe. In 2007, she appeared as an ancestor of Tasha Yar, Jenna Yar, in "Blood and Fire", an episode of the fan-produced series Star Trek: New Voyages. Tasha Yar was written into Star Trek Online as part of the third anniversary celebration in 2013. Denise Crosby recorded audio for the game, in scenes set after those in "Yesterday's Enterprise".

Appearances
Natasha Yar's origins are explained in the season four episode "Legacy". She was born on the planet Turkana IV in 2337. She had a younger sister named Ishara, who was born five years after her. Shortly after Ishara's birth, the girls' parents were killed and they were taken in by other people; however, they were subsequently abandoned and Tasha was required to look after her sister on her own. The government on the planet had collapsed, and the sisters were forced to scavenge for food while avoiding rape gangs. In 2352, aged 15, Tasha managed to leave Turkana IV. She never saw Ishara again; the latter joined the "Coalition", one of the factions on the planet before Tasha left. Tasha refused to join the cadres on the planet, blaming them for her parents' deaths.

Yar appeared for the first time in the pilot episode of Star Trek: The Next Generation as the Security and Tactical Officer on board the USS Enterprise-D. When Captain Picard orders an emergency saucer separation, Yar is one of the bridge crew to accompany him to the battle bridge. She is amongst the crew abducted by Q, and later serves on the away team to Farpoint Station. In "The Naked Now", while the crew are under the influence of an alien ailment, she initiates a sexual encounter with the android Data. In "Code of Honor" Yar is abducted by Lutan, the leader of the planet Ligon II, after she demonstrates her combat skills on the holodeck. She kills Lutan's wife Yareena in ritual combat to the death, though Yareena is revived on the Enterprise by Doctor Crusher. During the events of "Where No One Has Gone Before", Yar begins to hallucinate that she is back on Turkana IV and running for her life. In "The Arsenal of Freedom", Yar and Data are trapped together on the surface of the planet Minos and are attacked by a series of sentry probes that adapt to Data and Yar's phasers. The situation is resolved by Captain Picard, who is trapped elsewhere on the planet's surface with Dr. Crusher.

Yar forms part of the away team that beams down to Vagra II to rescue Deanna Troi from a crashed shuttlecraft in "Skin of Evil". She is killed by the creature Armus in a display of his power. The crew hold a memorial service for her on the holodeck, and Worf replaces her as chief tactical and security officer. After her death it is revealed that Data keeps a small hologram of her in his quarters. Despite Data's lack of emotions, he is described by reviewers as being sentimentally attached to her image. During the court hearing on Data's stature as a sentient being in "The Measure of a Man", he explains that he and Yar were intimate and that she was special to him.

After the USS Enterprise-C emerges from a rift in space-time in "Yesterday's Enterprise", the timeline is changed and Yar is once again alive and in her former position on the Enterprise-D. She works with the older Enterprise's helmsman, Richard Castillo, and the two become close. Guinan, who has some awareness of the timeline that would be restored by the Enterprise-C returning into the rift, confides in Yar that she believes that Yar died senselessly in that timeline. Based on that advice, Yar transfers to the Enterprise-C and returns with it to two decades into the past, and its expected destruction at the hands of the Romulans while defending the Klingon outpost Narendra III. The alternative universe version of Yar travelled back in time on board the Enterprise-C, and into the main timeline. This process was later described as "world jumping" rather than a typical timeline travel story by critics.

Yar's half-Romulan daughter Sela explains in "Redemption" that several members of the Enterprise-C crew were captured by the Romulans when it returned through the rift, including Yar. A Romulan general offered to spare the crew's lives if she became his consort. After a year, Yar gave birth to Sela. When Sela was four, Yar attempted to escape but Sela screamed to prevent her from being taken away from her father. After she was caught, Yar was executed.

The series finale "All Good Things..." includes Yar's final appearance, in scenes that take place prior to and in the early parts of "Encounter at Farpoint". As most of the bridge crew are yet to join the Enterprise-D in the scenes, Yar is one of the senior members of the crew under Captain Picard in the earliest of the three timeframes in the episode. She needs to be convinced by Picard to put the ship in danger in order to destroy the temporal anti-time anomaly that threatens to prevent life from evolving on Earth.

Reception and commentary

Science fiction writer Keith DeCandido considered Yar the most interesting role to appear in the "writer's bible", while Hal Boedeker characterized her as "forceful" in an article on women in Star Trek for Knight Ridder. A Den of Geek article by Martin Anderson also about women in Star Trek described the character as a predecessor to Kara "Starbuck" Thrace in the 2004 re-imagining of Battlestar Galactica. A Post-Tribune review of the series following the pilot described Yar as a "tough cookie" and the reviewer's favorite crew member. Frank Oglesbee, in his article on Deep Space Nine Kira Nerys, outlined the progression of female roles in "gender assumptions" from The Original Series where women were on the bridge, through Tasha Yar in The Next Generation where they were in command positions, to Deep Space Nine and Voyager where women were in lead roles. He noted specifically that women appeared in command positions more regularly as main and supporting characters, and were portrayed as more assertive and combative, with leading roles in action sequences.

In Sarah Projansky's contribution on rape in Star Trek to the book Enterprise Zones: Critical Positions on Star Trek, she extrapolates that Yar's introduction to Starfleet was similar to the actions of United States Army soldiers issuing supplies to the survivors of the atomic bombings of Hiroshima and Nagasaki and the liberation of Nazi concentration camps during the Second World War. The idea of an American savior of colonial rape victims stems from U.S. propaganda during the war, stating that "In TNG, the Federation citizen represents a new and improved version of this U.S. savior citizen; the Federation citizen is a post-nationalist, post-sexist, and post-racist soldier—feminist".

Reviewers have questioned the character's sexuality since the end of the series. Curve magazine speculated that Yar was a "closeted" lesbian. In the book Science Fiction Audiences: Watching Doctor Who and Star Trek, the authors describe her as "an obvious bisexual", but that "she should be a lesbian". Referring to the events in "The Naked Now", the authors explain "when they decided to straighten her, they used an android. So we ended up heterosexualizing two perfectly wonderful characters". The authors of the book Deep Space and Sacred Time: Star Trek in the American Mythos also thought that having Data and Yar consummate sexually was a means to state early on in the series the heterosexuality of the two most androgynous characters in the show.

Fans responded negatively to the departure of Yar as they felt that the character had potential for future expansion. Reviewers were also critical of the manner of Yar's death. Keith DeCandido called it "pointless", but thought that it was no worse than the deaths of other security officer "redshirts" throughout the history of Star Trek. He said that he preferred her death in "Skin of Evil" to the "clichéd-up-the-wazoo" death she experienced in "Yesterday's Enterprise". Gary Westfahl, in his book Space and Beyond: The Frontier Theme in Science Fiction, described Yar's death as one of the most notable ones in Star Trek, alongside that of Spock in Star Trek II: The Wrath of Khan and James T. Kirk in Star Trek Generations. SFX magazine included her first death in a 2012 list of the top 21 "Naff Sci-Fi Deaths", while the Chicago Sun-Times described her death in "Yesterday's Enterprise" as a "hero's death".

In 2017, IndieWire ranked Tasha as the 15th best character on Star Trek: The Next Generation.

See also

 List of Star Trek: The Next Generation characters

Notes

References

External links

Television characters introduced in 1987
Martial artist characters in television
Fictional orphans
Fictional women soldiers and warriors
Star Trek: The Next Generation characters
Starfleet lieutenants
Fictional people from the 24th-century